McDowell is an unincorporated community and census-designated place (CDP) in Floyd County, Kentucky, United States.

Demographics

See also

 List of census-designated places in Kentucky

References

External links

Census-designated places in Floyd County, Kentucky
Census-designated places in Kentucky
Unincorporated communities in Floyd County, Kentucky
Unincorporated communities in Kentucky